Toiyabea is a genus of North American plants in the aster tribe within the daisy family. The genus is named for the Toiyabe Mountains in the US state of Nevada. The only known species is Toiyabea alpina, the alpine serpentweed, native to the Toiyabe and Toquima Mountains of central Nevada (Nye and Lander Counties).

References

Astereae
Monotypic Asteraceae genera
Flora of Nevada